The Poetry Book Society (PBS) was founded in 1953 by T. S. Eliot and friends, including Sir Basil Blackwell, "to propagate the art of poetry". Eric Walter White was secretary from December 1953 until 1971, and was subsequently the society's chairman. The PBS was chaired by Philip Larkin in the 1980s. Each quarter the Society selects one newly published collection of poetry as its "Choice" title for its members and makes four "Recommendations" for optional purchase. In recent years, the Society has expanded its selected titles to promote translated poetry and pamphlets. The Society also publishes the quarterly poetry journal, the PBS Bulletin, and until 2016 administered the annual T. S. Eliot Prize for Poetry. Following the Poetry Society's instigation of its New Generation Poets promotion in 1994, the Poetry Book Society organised two subsequent "Next Generation Poets" promotions in 2004 and 2014. In 2016 the former Poetry Book Society charity which had managed the book club from 1953 had to be wound up, with its director Chris Holifield appointed as the new director of the T.S. Eliot Prize, and with its book club and company name taken over by book sales agency Inpress Ltd in Newcastle.

The British Library acquired the Poetry Book Society archive in 1988 and 1996 consisting of organisational papers, correspondence, financial papers, publicity and photographs.

See also 
 New Generation poets (1994)
 Next Generation poets (2004)
 Next Generation poets (2014)

References

Further reading
 Eric Walter White (ed.), Poetry Book Society: The First Twenty Five Years, 1954-1978, PBS, 1979. 
 Jonathan Barker (ed.), Thirty Years of the Poetry Book Society, Hutchinson, 1988. 
 Clare Brown & Don Paterson (eds.), Don't Ask Me What I Mean: Poets in Their Own Words, Picador, 2003.  [compilation from 50 years of PBS Bulletins, 1953-2003]

External links
Poetry Book Society
Poetry Book Society records, at the University of Maryland libraries

Poetry organizations
T. S. Eliot
1953 establishments in the United Kingdom
Arts organizations established in 1953
British poetry
British writers' organisations